St Mary's Church or St Marie's Church is a Roman Catholic Parish church in Halifax, West Yorkshire. It was built from 1836 to 1839. It is situated on the corner of Gibbet Street and Clarence Street, next to Burdock Way. It is the first Post-Reformation Roman Catholic church built in Halifax.

History

Construction
In 1831, plans were drawn for the construction of a church and a fundraising campaign was started for it. On 20 September 1836, the foundation stone was laid. On 27 November 1839, the church was opened. However, on 18 October 1863, a storm caused part of the church to collapse.

Reconstruction
After the storm it was decided to repair and enlarge the church. On 8 October 1864, a new foundation stone was laid. The architect was Ralph Nicholson. The work included rebuilding the roof, arcades certain walls and adding a tower. The cost came to £2,000. Work continued up to 11 November 1865.

Extension
In 1923, work began again to extend the church. The architect Clement Williams designed it and extended the church from a capacity of 380 to 900. The total cost came to £11,000. On 9 November 1924, the church was reopened. However, work continued until 1926.

Parish
Also in the parish of St Mary's is St Alban's Church. Clement Williams was also behind the designing of the church which was built from 1953 to 1954 and renovated in 1970.

St Mary's Church has two Sunday Masses: at 11:00am and (in Polish) at 12:45pm. St Alban's Church has two Sunday Masses: 9:30am and 6:00pm.

See also
 Roman Catholic Diocese of Leeds

References

External links

 St Mary's Parish site

Roman Catholic churches in West Yorkshire
Saint Mary
Gothic Revival church buildings in England
Roman Catholic churches completed in 1839
Gothic Revival architecture in West Yorkshire
Roman Catholic Diocese of Leeds
19th-century Roman Catholic church buildings in the United Kingdom